Visitors to Belarus must obtain a visa from one of the Belarusian diplomatic missions unless they come from one of the visa exempt countries or if their visa had been approved in advance for collection on arrival.

Visa policy map

Visa-free access

Citizens of the following 28 jurisdictions can enter Belarus without visas:

Non-ordinary passports

No visa is required for Belarus for holders of either diplomatic or other official passports of Algeria, Bangladesh, Bolivia, Bosnia and Herzegovina, Cambodia, Chile, Egypt, El Salvador, Guatemala, Hungary, India, Indonesia, Iran, Laos, Myanmar, Nicaragua, North Korea, Oman, Peru, Romania, Singapore, Slovakia, South Africa, South Korea, Sri Lanka, Syria, Thailand, Uruguay and Vietnam and for holders of diplomatic passports of Poland.

Non-ordinary passports of Israel require a visa.  

Additional requirements

All visitors are required to have adequate health insurance.

Future

Visa waiver agreement for holders of diplomatic and service passports was signed with  Colombia and it is yet to come into force.

A consensus between Belarus and Uruguay on mutual visa-free access was reached in November 2017. 

A draft agreement on mutual abolition of visas was proposed by Belarus to the United Arab Emirates in November 2017.

Plans for introduction of digital visas and travel authorization system were announced by Belarus in July 2018.

Plans to expand the regional visa free provisions to land border crossings and regionals airports were announced by Belarus in November 2019.

Regional visa free provisions

Visa-free access through Minsk National Airport
Foreign visitors who are citizens of designated countries are allowed to enter Belarus without a visa through the Minsk National Airport, except for flights departing to and from Russian airports. The allowed length of stay is up to 30 days, with mandatory registration for stays exceeding 5 days in length. Visitors must also depart from Minsk National Airport, departure by train (for example) is not permitted. The number of visa-free entries is unlimited.

The decree "On establishing a visa-free order of entrance and departure of foreign citizens" was signed by the President of Belarus on 9 January 2017 and it entered into force on 12 February 2017. It was amended by another presidential decree on 24 July 2018, which entered into force on 27 July 2018.

The EU residence cards are not accepted for this purpose.

In September 2017 it was announced that Belarus is planning to extend the visa-free access to 10 days and to other checkpoints.

In November 2017 statistics were published showing that 54,000 foreigners visited Belarus through the visa-free program, mostly citizens of Germany, Poland, Italy, United States and the United Kingdom.

Effective since 17 October 2021, visa is required for US citizens to travel to Belarus.

Brest-Grodno

The single visa-free territory "Brest – Grodno" was established by a presidential decree signed in August 2019 and has been in effect since November 10, 2019.

Visitors are allowed to stay without a visa for 15 days. Entry is possible through the following checkpoints with Poland and Lithuania - Brest (Terespol), Bruzgi (Kuźnica), Damačava (Sławatycze), Bieniakoni (Šalčininkai), Bierastavica (Bobrowniki), Piasčatka (Połowce), Pryvalka (Raigardas), Piareraŭ (Białowieża), Liasnaja (Rudawka), Pryvalka (Švendubrė), Brest-Uschodni Railway Station, Grodno Railway Station, Brest Airport and Grodno Airport. Prior to travel, visitors must obtain an appropriate document issued by a local travel agency registered in Belarus.

The list of eligible nationalities is the same as that for the visa-free program through the Minsk National Airport, only without restrictions for certain nationalities.

The visa-free zone consists of the following territories:

 parts of Grodno and Brest regions not listed above – when traveling on a tourist route as a member of an organised travel group.

The legislation superseded the previous decrees that established two separate visa-free zones: Brest area including Belovezhskaya Pushcha National Park (since June 2015) and Augustów Canal area including Grodno (since October 2016).

Visa on arrival
The Foreign Admissions Division at the Minsk International Airport of the Consular Directorate of the Ministry of Foreign Affairs issues visas on arrival if the support documents were submitted not later than 3 business days before expected date of arrival. If the reason for arrival is serious illness or death of a close relative or family member visa support documents can be submitted at the moment of application for an entry visa. Fees are significantly higher than at the consulates.

In January 2015 fees for single short-term visa on arrival were as follows:
Nationals of states (unless separately noted) with consular offices of Belarus: EUR 180
Nationals of states (unless separately noted) without consular offices of Belarus: EUR 90

eVisa
In July 2019, Belarus announced a plan to introduce an eVisa system in 2020.

Reciprocity

Belarusian citizens can enter all of the countries whose citizens are granted permanent visa-free access to Belarus without a visa. Among the countries granted short visa-free access under a pilot program Belarusian citizens are granted visa-free access to Antigua and Barbuda, Dominica, Haiti, Indonesia, Malaysia, Micronesia, Nicaragua, Panama, Peru, Saint Vincent and the Grenadines, Seychelles and Vanuatu.

Statistics

Most visitors arriving to Belarus were from the following countries:

See also
Visa requirements for Belarusian citizens

References

External links

 Procedure for obtaining visas to enter the Republic of Belarus, Ministry of Foreign Affairs of the Republic of Belarus
 Types of Belarusian entry visas and visa support documents,  Ministry of Foreign Affairs of the Republic of Belarus
 Visa-free travel,  Ministry of Foreign Affairs of the Republic of Belarus
 Bilateral agreements on non-visa trips of citizens, National Center of Legal Information of the Republic of Belarus

Foreign relations of Belarus
Belarus